The 1972 U.S. Open was the 72nd U.S. Open, held June 15–18 at Pebble Beach Golf Links in Pebble Beach, California. Jack Nicklaus, age 32, captured his third U.S. Open title, three strokes ahead of runner-up Bruce Crampton. This was the first of six major championships held to date at Pebble Beach: five U.S. Opens and the PGA Championship in 1977.

Scoring conditions during the final round were extremely difficult; the average was 78.8, the highest in post-war U.S. Open history. Nicklaus' 290 (+2) was the second-highest winning score during that span. It was Nicklaus' eleventh career major championship as a professional, tying the record of Walter Hagen. When combined with his two U.S. Amateur wins, it was his thirteenth major, equaling Bobby Jones for most 

Defending champion Lee Trevino had been hospitalized in Texas for several days for bronchitis and pneumonia; he was released on Tuesday, two days before the first round, and tied for fourth.

It was the second consecutive major title for Nicklaus, who won the Masters in April. Previous winners of the first two majors of the year were Craig Wood (1941), Ben Hogan (1951, 1953), and Arnold Palmer (1960); later champions of both were Tiger Woods (2002) and Jordan Spieth (2015). In addition, Nicklaus held the PGA Championship title from February 1971; four weeks later, he was the runner-up by a single stroke at the Open Championship at Muirfield, Scotland.

Nicklaus won seven additional majors, the last at the Masters fourteen years later in 1986 at age 46.

Course layout

Past champions in the field 

Note: all eight former champions in the field made the cut.

Round summaries

First round
Thursday, June 15, 1972

Source:

Second round
Friday, June 16, 1972

Source:

Third round
Saturday, June 17, 1972

Source:

Final round
Sunday, June 18, 1972

In high winds, Nicklaus was even par on the front nine; after a double-bogey at the tenth, Arnold Palmer and Bruce Crampton trailed by just two shots. Palmer had a chance to tie Nicklaus at the 14th, but he missed a 10-footer (3 m) for birdie. Down by one stroke, Palmer bogeyed the next two holes and finished with a final-round 76, four shots behind.

With a three-shot lead over Crampton on the tee of the par-3 17th, Nicklaus hit one of his most famous shots. His 1-iron went directly at the pin, bounced once, struck the flagstick, and settled inches from the hole for a tap-in birdie. With the lead at four strokes on the final tee, he bogeyed for 74 (+2) and the win.

Source:

Scorecard

Cumulative tournament scores, relative to par
{|class="wikitable" span = 50 style="font-size:85%;
|-
|style="background: Pink;" width=10|
|Birdie
|style="background: PaleGreen;" width=10|
|Bogey
|style="background: Green;" width=10|
|Double bogey
|style="background: Olive;" width=10|
|Triple bogey+
|}
Source:

References

External links
USGA Championship Database

U.S. Open (golf)
Golf in California
U.S. Open
U.S. Open (golf)
U.S. Open (golf)
U.S. Open (golf)